The 1918 Copa del Rey Final was the 18th. final of the Spanish cup competition, the Copa del Rey. The final was played at O'Donnell Stadium in Madrid on 12 May 1918. Real Unión beat Madrid FC 2–0 and won their second title. The star of the game was Juan Legarreta who scored both goals. Real Unión's captain Juan Legarreta was the keyplayer of the match, having scored both goals. He would later continue his career in Chile.

Match details 

|valign="top" width="50%"|

|}

References

1918
Copa
Real Madrid CF matches
Real Unión matches
May 1918 sports events